In geophysics, Knott's equations were the first equations to describe the amplitudes of reflected and refracted waves generated at non-normal incidence upon an interface.  They were derived in 1899 by the British geophysicist Cargill Gilston Knott using displacement potential functions and describe the same phenomenon that the Zoeppritz equations describe in terms of amplitude displacements.

References

Seismology measurement
Petroleum geology